Benziodarone is a vasodilator.

Bufeniode has the same aromatic substitution pattern.

See also
 Amiodarone
 Benzbromarone, the brominated analogue of benziodarone, used as an uricosuric
 Dronedarone

References

 

Diarylketones
Hepatotoxins
Iodoarenes
Vasodilators